Ichagaki is a settlement in Kenya's Central Province.

Populated places in Central Province (Kenya)